Jonathan Jacob Walker (born September 17, 1985) is an American musician, singer, songwriter, and record producer. Formerly the bassist of Panic! at the Disco, Walker was also the lead guitarist and occasional split vocalist of The Young Veins (which he founded with Panic! at the Disco's former lead guitarist and songwriter Ryan Ross), which is now on indefinite hiatus. Having gone on to release several solo recordings, he is now mostly songwriting and producing.

Musical career
Walker attended Bartlett High School in Bartlett, Illinois and first became known in the Chicago scene in 2003 when he was just 17 years old as the replacement bass player for 504 Plan. Walker then toured with The Academy Is... as a guitar tech and a videographer. Walker joined Panic! at the Disco in May 2006, replacing former bassist Brent Wilson. At the time he joined, he was 20 years old, making him the oldest band member. Walker was with Panic! at the Disco when they won the video of the year award at the 2006 MTV Video Music Awards for their song "I Write Sins Not Tragedies". He co-wrote and released one studio album with the band, Pretty. Odd., and one live album, ...Live in Chicago.
 	
In July 2009, he and fellow band member Ryan Ross left Panic! at the Disco, citing creative differences, and formed another band, The Young Veins. The Young Veins completed two tours in 2010, one with Foxy Shazam and one with Rooney. On December 10, 2010, Walker announced via Twitter that The Young Veins would be on hiatus, later noting in interviews that the creative and personal differences of the past carried over to the new project.

Since 2011, he has self-released 2 full-length and 3 EP solo albums, all of which are currently available for free download from his official Bandcamp page. He has also released a song with Victoria Asher, formerly of Cobra Starship, titled "When Push Comes to Shove" on December 15, 2016. On July 24, 2018, the short film Intermission was released, for which Walker composed the original score.

Discography

With Panic! at the Disco
March 2008 – Pretty. Odd.
December 2008 – ...Live in Chicago

With The Young Veins
June 2010 – Take a Vacation!

Solo discography
January 2011 – Home Recordings (EP)
October 2011 – New Songs (LP)
November 2012 – Crazy Dream (EP)
January 2014 – Connections (LP)
October 2015 – Real Life (EP)
December 2016 – "Push Comes to Shove" (single) by Vicky-T, features Walker as co-writer and background vocals
December 2018 – "The Way It Was" (single)
January 2019 – Impending Bloom (EP)
June 2021 – Different (LP)

References

External links
 Official website
 Heave Media interview, 5/20/2011
 Buzznet interview, 6/27/2011

Living people
American rock bass guitarists
American male bass guitarists
Panic! at the Disco members
People from Hanover Park, Illinois
Guitarists from Chicago
Place of birth missing (living people)
1985 births